The 2020 AIHL season was going to be the 21st season of the Australian Ice Hockey League (AIHL). It was originally scheduled to run from 18 April 2020 until 23 August 2020, with the Goodall Cup finals following on 29 August and 30 August 2020. However, on 12 March 2020 the league announced the postponement of the 2020 season to a to be determined date due to COVID-19. Then on 29 July 2020, the AIHL commission's return to play committee announced the official cancellation of the 2020 AIHL season due to July COVID outbreaks on the east coast as well as continued border closures for WA and SA. This marked the first time the Goodall Cup was not awarded since 1993, when the competition was cancelled as a result of financial problems.

Teams
In 2020 the AIHL had planned to have 8 teams competing in the league.

League business

On 11 February 2020, the AIHL announced the league would be adopting the international standard sixty minutes match length. Between 2013 and 2019 the AIHL ran fifty minute matches, while prior to that the league ran forty-five minute matches. The change increases the league's matches by ten minutes and standardises the period lengths to twenty minutes each. The change came into effect for the 2020 season. On 12 March 2020, the CBR Brave announced they would be livestreaming all home matches at Phillip Ice Skating Centre for the 2020 season. A partnership with production company Wonqy would deliver the stream. Later on 12 March 2020, AIHL commissioner, David Turik announced the 2020 season would be postponed due to the coronavirus pandemic (COVID-19). The AIHL Commission held consultation with the teams and took medical advice from State and Federal Governments in coming to the decision. The Commission did not release a new proposed start date for the 2020 season but will meet regularly to discuss progress and determine if there is a time period for the season to be moved to. In late July the AIHL commission's return to play committee released a public update to advise the 2020 season had been cancelled and would not go ahead. In early August, a new incorporated body was established in Brisbane, Queensland with the mission to expand the league and secure an AIHL licence for 2022.

Exhibition games

On 7 January 2020, the Melbourne Ice and Melbourne Mustangs co-announced the organisation of an exhibition charity match to be played between the two teams to raise money for the Victorian Bushfire Appeal. The match was scheduled for 19 January 2020 at O’Brien Icehouse. The Ice defeated the Mustangs 5–2 in the charity match with the event raising over $50,000.

On 13 January 2020, it was announced that the South Australian ice hockey community, including the Adelaide Adrenaline, Adelaide Rush and Avalanche alumni had arranged for an exhibition charity match for 9 February 2020. The match was named The Bushfire Appeal Ice Hockey Classic with teams broken into ‘Locals’ and ‘Rest of the World’. In front of a packed out IceArenA, the Locals came from 6-4 down in the second intermission to claim a 7-6 (OT) victory. The Locals won with a golden goal scored by Adelaide Rush player Tash Farrier in the 3v3 overtime period. The event raised $23,951 with all money going to CFS Foundation and Kangaroo Island Mayoral Relief and Recovery Bushfire Fund to assist with the Adelaide Hills and Kangaroo Island fire recovery effort.

On 27 January 2020, the Sydney Ice Dogs and Sydney Bears announced they would hold a bushfire recovery appeal charity match between the two teams at Macquarie Ice Rink on 21 February 2020. All proceeds would go to the NSW Rural Fire Service and Australian Red Cross. The Bears defeated the Ice Dogs 6–3 in the event.

On 28 February 2020, Melbourne Mustangs announced the annual pre-season exhibition Melbourne derby involving the Mustangs and Ice would be held at the Icehouse on Saturday 4 April. On 16 March 2020, the Ice and Mustangs officially cancelled their pre-season exhibition game due to COVID-19 and the postponement of the AIHL season.

On 2 March 2020, Adelaide Adrenaline announced a pre-season exhibition match against a South Australian Select team for 21 March 2020 to be held at the Adelaide IceArenA. On 15 March 2020, the Adrenaline officially cancelled their pre-season exhibition game due to COVID-19 and the postponement of the AIHL season.

On 30 July 2020, one day after the cancellation of the 2020 AIHL season, the Newcastle Northstars and Sydney Ice Dogs announced the formation of the 2020 Hawkesbury Classic exhibition series between the two teams. The four match series was originally to be held at both the Hunter Ice Skating Stadium in Newcastle and Macquarie Ice Rink in Sydney between 2 August and 22 August 2020. On 14 August 2020, it was revealed the series would be extended by three matches, creating a full seven match series. Game One ended with the Ice Dogs claiming a 3–2 overtime victory to take a 1–0 lead in the series. Game two saw the Ice Dogs double their lead in the series to 2–0 with a 3–2 overtime victory. Game three was won by the Northstars in a 5–4 shootout victory, halving the Ice Dog's series lead to 2–1.

Personnel changes

On 11 January 2020, Adelaide Adrenaline announced former player and head coach Sami Mantere had been re-appointed as head coach for the 2020 season. Sami replaced outgoing head coach, Jim Fuyarchuk, who held the position for the last two seasons.

On 31 January 2020, Melbourne Ice announced their new head coach for 2020 would be Canadian Michael Marshall. Michael hails from Calgary, Alberta and joins the team off the back of four years coaching in Sweden.

On 8 February 2020, Perth Thunder announced Dave Ruck had ended his three-year tenure as head coach of the West Australian team. The 2017 AIHL coach of the year would be replaced by the recently retired former Thunder player, Ben Breault. The appointment is the first senior head coaching role for Breault.

On 24 February 2020, CBR Brave announced head coach Rob Starke would not be returning for the 2020 AIHL season. Starke had left Canberra and moved back to Canada for personal and professional reasons in the off-season. Rob left the Brave having guided the team to their first three titles including the 2018 Goodall Cup. On 27 February 2020, the Brave announced Stuart Philps as the team's new head coach and Rob's replacement.

Player transfers

Interclub transfers

* Mid-season transfer.

Retirements

New signings

Players lost

Regular season
The regular season began on 18 April 2020 and ran through to 23 August 2020 before the top four teams advanced to compete in the Goodall Cup finals weekend.

April

May

June

July

August

Standings

Skater statistics

2020 AIHL season top-ten lists for the following four skater statistical categories: Points, Goals, Assists and Penalty minutes.

Goaltender statistics

2020 AIHL season top-ten lists for the following two goaltender statistical categories: Goals against average and Save percentage

Goodall Cup playoffs
The 2020 finals weekend is scheduled to begin on 29 August with the Goodall Cup final held on 30 August. Following the end of the regular season the top four teams advance to the finals weekend, which is to be held at STADIUM in LOCATION. The series is a single game elimination with the two winning semi-finalists advancing to the Goodall Cup final. The winner of the final lifts the historic Goodall Cup.

All times are UTC+10:00

Semi-finals

Final

References

External links
The Australian Ice Hockey League
Ice Hockey Australia

2020 in ice hockey
2020 in Australian sport
2020
Ice hockey events cancelled due to the COVID-19 pandemic